A Gentleman's Game is a 2002 American sports drama film directed by J. Mills Goodloe and starring Mason Gamble, Dylan Baker, Philip Baker Hall and Gary Sinise.  It is based on the novel of the same name by Tom Coyne.

Cast
 Mason Gamble as Timmy Price
 Dylan Baker as Mr. Price
 Philip Baker Hall as Charlie Logan
 Gary Sinise as Foster Pearse
 Brian Doyle-Murray as Tomato Face
Henry Simmons
Ellen Muth

References

External links
 
 

American sports drama films
2002 drama films
2002 films
Films based on American novels
Films scored by Jeff Beal
2000s English-language films
2000s American films